was a village located in Ochi District, Ehime Prefecture, Japan.

As of 2003, the village had an estimated population of 1,982 and a density of 512.14 persons per km2. The total area was 3.87 km2.

On October 1, 2004, Ikina, along with the town of Yuge, and the villages of Iwagi and Uoshima (all from Ochi District), was merged to create the town of Kamijima and no longer exists as an independent municipality.

External links
Official website of Kamijima  in Japanese

Dissolved municipalities of Ehime Prefecture
Kamijima, Ehime